Robert Lee "Jack" Boone (May 28, 1918 – February 6, 1984) was an American football player and coach; most notably he served as head coach for the college football team of East Carolina College (now East Carolina University) for ten years.

Early years
Boone was a native of Portsmouth, Virginia, and attended Elon College, where he played on the football team as a halfback from 1938 to 1941, and was co-captain his senior year. After his college career, he was signed by the Cleveland Rams in 1942, and played in two games for them. He later served in the US Navy during World War II.

East Carolina
Boone joined the coaching staff of East Carolina in September 1948, as assistant football coach. He was the college baseball coach for three seasons; his teams posted a 38–23–2 record, for a .623 winning percentage.

In 1952, Boone became head football coach for East Carolina, the ninth in the program's history. That year, the Pirates saw their first action in the postseason when they played Clarion State College in the Lions Bowl, but lost 13–6. In 1953, the Pirates became the North State Conference champions and played in the Elks Bowl, where they lost 12–0 to Morris Harvey College. Boone was named the Coach of the Year in the North State Conference, after his team finished 8–2. Boone's football coaching career lasted ten years, during which he compiled a 49–45–5 record. He was dismissed as head coach in November 1961.

Later years
Boone was inducted into the athletic hall of fame of Elon in 1972, and of East Carolina in 1981. He died in February 1984 at Pitt County Memorial Hospital in Greenville, North Carolina.

Head coaching record

Football

References

External links
 

1918 births
1984 deaths
People from Roanoke Rapids, North Carolina
Cleveland Rams players
East Carolina Pirates baseball coaches
East Carolina Pirates football coaches
Elon Phoenix football players
United States Navy personnel of World War II
Sportspeople from Portsmouth, Virginia